Grzeboszowice  (German Greboschowitz) is a village in the administrative district of Gmina Ujazd, within Strzelce County, Opole Voivodeship, in south-western Poland.

Gallery

References

Grzeboszowice